The Entenza House, also known as Case Study House #9, is a single occupancy residential building in Pacific Palisades, Los Angeles. The address is 205 Chautauqua Boulevard, Los Angeles California, 90272. It was designed by industrial designer Charles Eames, and architect Eero Saarinen for John Entenza as part of the Case Study House Program. The house was designed between 1945 and 1949 and construction was completed in 1950. Named accordingly, Entenza wanted to use the Case Study House #9 for himself as his private residence. He lived within the home for five years before selling it.

The Case Study Houses program, included 36 prototypes, and was led by John Entenza in 1945 to 1966 after the Weißenhof-siedlung exposition in an effort to study “economic, easy-to build houses” in regards to residential purposes following the Second World War. As the ninth house to be built for the Case Study Houses project, the Entenza House started construction in 1945 and was completed in 1949 in the Modern style, and later added to until 1962. The new materials of concrete, plywood panels, metal, and glass were used to showcase the technological advances of the time, exemplifying the new automotive era. These materials allowed for a flexible and adaptable design with open concepts that proved to be both comfortable and functional. Due to a recovering economy from the Second World War, these materials were also considered to be low-cost and budget friendly. The Entenza House later went on to receive a place on the list for the National Register of Historic Places in 2013.

Case Study Houses #8 and #9 
Charles Eames, who helped design Entenza's home, also designed his own house near Entenza's. On an adjacent piece of land, this home is now known as case study house #8, or the Eames House. At the time, Eames and other designers were experimenting with open floor plans that included “multi-purpose rooms” dividing “public and private spaces” as a means to adapt to the new ways the home was being used for leisure purposes at the time. Naturally being designed by the same people, the Eames House and Entenza House seem to balance each other out as they play with axes and planes in the design. The Eames house is “described as a revealed vertical space,” while the Entenza house is a “complementary concealed horizontal space.”

The Eames House continues to be open for tours today, while the Entenza House remains a private residence with additions and renovations being made by each consequent owner.

Placement on National Register of Historic Places 
The Entenza Home was entered in the National Register via the National Park Service Certification, and later officially registered on the National Register of Historic Places on May 28, 2013. It is classified as a domestic single dwelling private property, having the architectural classification of the “Modern” style.

The Entenza House made the National Registry for a few reasons; the first being that it was a representation of residential housing during the postwar era. The house also showcases many of the architectural features associated with the Case Study House program as a whole, which was said to be the model for the new “modern home” at the time. It was also considered to be historically significant because it was the first steel frame project to be built in the Case Study program, with the Eames House (Case Study House #8) following suit.

Layout and Materials 
Considered the new definition of the modern home, these homes featured construction using new materials and methods. The original floorplan of the home included “two bedrooms, a study, two bathrooms, kitchen, large open living/dining area, utility room and garage,” and was completed in 1949. The Entenza House hosts a simplistic and flexible steel frame structure made of steel four-inch H-columns, supporting twelve-inch open web joists, that provide an open plan concept inside. To further the simplicity, the roof is a concrete slab with birch wood over the soffits. The use of the new glass and concrete materials provided by Libbey-Owens-Ford glass with Truscon steel window framing and Rocklite respectively, allowed for the undetectable transition between indoors and outdoors throughout the space. These new materials were chosen for their ability to lower the cost of maintenance, heating, and lighting, as well as their ability to expand the usable space of a home for comfortable living.

On the same lot as four other Case Study Houses, the shared narrow driveway was later changed in the 1990s “to accommodate a much larger residence on the ocean side of the property.” The only remaining part of the house left untouched from the original design and construction is the ocean-side portion of the home.

The floor plan was designed to reflect Entenza's desire for a home that facilitates conversation and entertainment. The floor plan includes a large open living room that spans 36 feet in length. In order to create a public gathering space in the home that was readily adaptable to any sized party, the living room was made as an open plan concept, with a large fireplace separating a smaller and larger portion of the living room. Adjacent to the living room is the dining room, a kitchen, two bedrooms, two bathrooms, and a study. The part of the house oriented to the ocean houses the large public space, connected by a covered hallway to the rest of the house.

The interior of the Entenza house materials consists of “plastered and wood-paneled surfaces.” The part of the house facing the ocean houses the large public space, connected by a covered hallway to the rest of the house. Despite the desire to showcase new technologies of Modern design with the new materials previously stated, the Entenza house covered up most of the steel-framing with wood-paneled cladding on the interior.

References

External links 

 Arts & Architecture PDF description
National Register of Historic Places registration file

Eero Saarinen structures
Works by Charles and Ray Eames
Buildings and structures in Los Angeles
Houses completed in 1950
Houses on the National Register of Historic Places in Los Angeles